Erich August Gottlieb Albrecht (1907–1979) was a German-born (Magdeburg) Professor of German at the University of Kansas and Tulane University and war-time military intelligence worker in the United States Army.

Emigration 
Albrecht emigrated from Germany to the United States in 1932, becoming officially naturalized in 1943. He studied at various colleges culminating in the award of a Ph.D. (his thesis was Primitivism and Related Ideas in Eighteenth Century German Lyric Poetry 1680-1740) from the Johns Hopkins University in 1941.

World War II work 
During World War II he was engaged by American Intelligence in London and traveled to Germany after the war in Europe had ended. Albrecht interviewed Hitler's secretary Christa Schroeder in Berchtesgaden 22 May 1945. He was also, for a short period after the war, a special consultant to the US secretary of War.

After the war
He later taught German at Newcomb College, Tulane University (1946–1965: Professor of German 1963 Departmental Chairman 1957–60, 62––65) and in 1965 joined the University of Kansas (and at the Max Kade Center for German-American Studies) as J. Anthony Burzle Professor of German Language and Literature.

His entry in Who's Who in America lists him as having been awarded the title of honor citizen of New Orleans (1965) and as having been awarded a German decorated Order of Merit (1960). These and further biographical details have been published in the Internationales Germanistenlexikon.

Selected publications

 Albrecht, E. (1938) Deutschland im Umbruch, Lippincott, 1938. (xi-231, text 143 pp.)
 Albrecht, Erich A. (1949) New German Words in Popular English Dictionaries, The German Quarterly, Vol. 22, No. 1 (Jan.), pp. 10–16
 Albrecht, Erich August Gottlieb (1950) Primitivism and Related Ideas in Eighteenth Century German Lyric Poetry 1680–1740,  J. H. Furst, Baltimore
 Albrecht, Erich A.  (1954) "Zur Entstehungsgeschichte von Kafkas Landarzt", Monatshefte, Vol. 46, No. 4 (Apr. - May), pp. 207–212

References 

University of Kansas faculty
Tulane University faculty
Professors of German in the United States
Germanists
Johns Hopkins University alumni
1907 births
1979 deaths
Writers from Magdeburg
German emigrants to the United States